Lieutenant commander (also hyphenated lieutenant-commander and abbreviated Lt Cdr, LtCdr. or LCDR) is a commissioned officer rank in many navies. The rank is superior to a lieutenant and subordinate to a commander. The corresponding rank in most armies and air forces is major, and in the Royal Air Force and other Commonwealth air forces is squadron leader.

The NATO rank code is mostly OF-3.

A lieutenant commander is a department officer or the executive officer (second-in-command) on many warships and smaller shore installations, or the commanding officer of a smaller ship/installation. They are also department officers in naval aviation squadrons.

Etymology

Most Commonwealth and other navies address lieutenant commanders by their full rank or the positions they occupy ("captain" if in command of a vessel). The United States Navy, however, addresses officers by their full rank or the higher grade of the rank. For example, oral communications in formal and informal situations, a lieutenant (junior grade) is abbreviated as "lieutenant," and a lieutenant commander is abbreviated as "commander."

Origins
Lieutenants were commonly put in command of smaller vessels not warranting a commander or captain. Such a lieutenant was called a "lieutenant commanding" or "lieutenant commandant" in the United States Navy, and a "lieutenant in command," "lieutenant and commander," or "senior lieutenant" in the Royal Navy. The USN settled on "lieutenant commander" in 1862 and made it a distinct rank. The RN followed suit in March 1914.

Canada

In the Royal Canadian Navy, the rank is the naval rank equal to major in the army or air force and is the first senior officer rank. Lieutenant commanders are senior to lieutenants (N) and to army and air force captains, and are junior to commanders and lieutenant colonels.

United Kingdom

Royal Navy

The insignia worn by a Royal Navy lieutenant commander is two medium gold braid stripes with one thin gold stripe running in between, placed upon a navy blue/black background. The top stripe has the ubiquitous loop used in all RN officer rank insignia, except for the rank of Midshipman. The RAF follows this pattern with its equivalent rank of squadron leader.

Having fewer officer ranks than the army, the RN previously split some of its ranks by seniority (time in rank) to provide equivalence: hence a lieutenant with fewer than eight years seniority wore two stripes, and ranked with an army captain; a lieutenant of eight years or more wore two stripes with a thinner one in between, and ranked with a major. This distinction was ostensibly abolished when the rank of lieutenant commander was introduced, although promotion to the latter rank was automatic following accumulation of eight years’ seniority as a lieutenant. Automatic promotion was stopped at the start of the 21st Century and promotion is now only awarded on merit.

Royal Observer Corps
Throughout much of its existence, the British Royal Observer Corps (ROC) maintained a rank of observer lieutenant commander. The ROC wore a Royal Air Force uniform and their rank insignia appeared similar to that of an RAF squadron leader except that the stripes were shown entirely in black. Prior to the renaming, the rank had been known as observer lieutenant (first class).

United States

In the United States, the rank of lieutenant commander exists in the United States Navy, United States Coast Guard, United States Public Health Service Commissioned Corps, and National Oceanic and Atmospheric Administration Commissioned Officer Corps.

Within the U.S. Navy, lieutenant commanders are listed as junior officers. There are two insignia used by U.S. Navy and U.S. Coast Guard lieutenant commanders. On service khakis and all working uniforms, lieutenant commanders wear a gold oak leaf collar device, similar to the ones worn by majors in the United States Air Force and United States Army, and identical to that worn by majors in the United States Marine Corps. In all dress uniforms, they wear sleeve braid or shoulder boards bearing a single gold quarter-inch stripe between two gold half-inch strips (nominal size). Above or inboard of the stripes, they wear their speciality insignia (i.e., a star for officers of the line, single oak leaf for medical with silver acorn for Medical Corps, crossed oak leaves for Civil Engineer Corps, United States shield for the Coast Guard, etc.) The Uniformed Services of the United States designate the rank as O-4.

Gallery

References

Naval ranks
Military ranks of Australia
Military ranks of Denmark